The Voice Srbija is an unreleased Serbian reality television singing competition on  Prva TV. It is based on the reality singing competition The Voice of Holland, originally created by the Dutch television producer, John de Mol, as part of The Voice franchise.

See also 
 Prva Srpska Televizija
 Zvezde Granda
 The Voice (TV series)

References 

Serbia
Serbian reality television series
Unaired television shows
Prva Srpska Televizija original programming